Ambrus ( or ) is a village in the Municipality of Ivančna Gorica in central Slovenia. The area is part of the historical region of Lower Carniola. The municipality is now included in the Central Slovenia Statistical Region.

Name
Ambrus was attested in historical sources as Ambros in 1433, Ambruschs in 1463, and Wrwchs in 1484, among other variants.

Church
The parish church in the settlement is dedicated to Saint Bartholomew and belongs to the Roman Catholic Diocese of Novo Mesto. It was built in 1811.

References

External links
Ambrus on Geopedia

Populated places in the Municipality of Ivančna Gorica